Gilroy is a city in Northern California's Santa Clara County, south of Morgan Hill and north of San Benito County. Gilroy is the southernmost city in the San Francisco Bay Area, with a population of 56,766 as of the 2019 U.S. Census Projections.

Gilroy's origins lie in the village of San Ysidro that grew in the early 19th century out of Rancho San Ysidro, granted to Californio ranchero Ygnacio Ortega in 1809. Following Ygnacio's death in 1833, his daughter Clara Ortega de Gilroy and son-in-law John Gilroy inherited the largest portion of the rancho and began developing the settlement. When the town was incorporated in 1868, it was renamed in honor of John Gilroy, a Scotsman who had emigrated to California in 1814, naturalized as a Mexican citizen, adopted the Spanish language, and converted to Catholicism, taking the name of Juan Bautista Gilroy.

Gilroy is known for its garlic crop and the annual Gilroy Garlic Festival, featuring various garlicky foods such as garlic ice cream, leading to the city's nickname, the Garlic Capital of the World. It is also known for boutique wine production, as part of the Santa Clara Valley AVA, mostly consisting of family vineyards around the base of the Santa Cruz Mountains to the west.

History

Spanish era
Spanish explorers led by Juan Bautista de Anza first passed through the Santa Clara Valley area in 1776, and in 1797 Mission San Juan Bautista was established near the Pajaro River. In 1809, Ygnacio Ortega was granted the  Spanish land concession Rancho San Ysidro. The village of San Ysidro grew nearby, at the foot of Pacheco Pass which linked the El Camino Real and the Santa Clara Valley with the San Joaquin Valley.  California's main exports at this time were hides and tallow, of which thousands of barrels were produced and shipped to the rest of New Spain. Trade and diplomatic intercourse with foreigners was strictly forbidden by the royal government but was quietly carried on by Californians desperate for luxury goods.

Mexican era
During the War of 1812, the armed merchantman Isaac Todd was sent by the North West Company to seize Fort Astoria, an American trading post at the mouth of the Columbia River.  The ship, with a Royal Navy escort, departed from Portsmouth, England, made its way around Cape Horn and proceeded up the Pacific coast of the Americas, stopping at Spanish ports for supplies along the way. In January 1814, having fallen behind its escort, the Isaac Todd arrived at Monterey, California, the Spanish colonial capital of Alta California. During the visit, ordinary seaman John Gilroy (a Scotsman who had changed his name from John Cameron when he went to sea to avoid recognition) either (depending on the historical source) jumped ship or was left ashore to recover from scurvy.

John Gilroy (1794–1869), also known as Juan Bautista Gilroy, spent the next few years moving around among the missions, pueblos and ranchos, plying his trade as a cooper (barrel maker). At first, by his own account in an 1856 letter to Thomas O. Larkin, Gilroy was one of only two English-speakers resident in Alta California. Eventually, he found his way to Rancho San Ysidro, converted to Roman Catholicism and became the first naturalized English-speaking settler in Alta California. In 1821, the same year Mexico won its independence from Spain, Gilroy married a daughter of his employer, ranchero Ygnacio Ortega. Upon Ygnacio's death in 1833, the rancho was divided among his three children—including Gilroy's wife Maria Clara. In 1867, under U.S. property law, the Rancho San Ysidro (Gilroy) was patented to John Gilroy.

The settlement now known as "Old Gilroy" grew up around Gilroy's rancho complex and, after the end of the Mexican–American War in 1848, Gilroy served as alcalde of the village. It served as  a stagecoach station of the Butterfield Overland Mail and other stage lines in the late 19th century.

American era

Following the U.S. Conquest of California and the discovery of gold in the Sierra Nevada in 1848, the trickle of immigrants from the eastern states and abroad became a flood. As many of the earlier Mexican and Californio landowners sold off their land, lost it to squatters, or were dispossessed through title hearings, the area around San Ysidro became known as Pleasant Valley. On March 12, 1870, it was officially incorporated by the state legislature as the town of Gilroy (John Gilroy had died in 1869). By then the town center had been relocated west of the El Camino Real (Old Gilroy is today a sparsely populated agricultural area). 

Cattle ranching and timber from the nearby Santa Cruz Mountains were important to the economy for some time but, as in the rest of the valley, agriculture was the town's greatest source of income. During the 1920s, Kiyoshi “Jimmy” Hirasaki began growing garlic commercially in the Gilroy area. Referred to as the "Garlic King", Hirasaki continued to farm garlic into the 1950s.  In 1979, the Gilroy Garlic Festival was launched. Farming remains significant, but in the 1970s the city began evolving into a bedroom community for Silicon Valley to the north.

There are a number of extant historical buildings dating from the mid-19th century. Built in 1857, the Christian Church at 160 Fifth Street is the oldest wood-framed church in continuous use in Santa Clara County. Blacksmith George Eustice's house at 213 Fifth Street was constructed in 1869; Eustice was an American Civil War veteran who fought at Gettysburg.  Samuel Moore was a long-time Gilroy postmaster, whose home was built in the 1870s at 7151 Church Street.<ref>Santa Clara County Heritage Resource Inventory, Santa Clara County Historical Heritage Commission, published by Santa Clara County, San Jose, Ca., June, 1979</ref>

Nearby in the foothills of the Diablo Range to the northeast is the historic resort site Gilroy Yamato Hot Springs, first developed in the 1870s (and now closed to the public). In 1905, the Old City Hall was built in downtown Gilroy; in 1975, it was designated on the list of National Register of Historic Places.

2019 Festival shooting

On July 28, 2019, a mass shooting occurred at the 2019 Gilroy Garlic Festival. Three people were killed by the gunman and at least 12 others were injured. The suspect, Santino William Legan, committed suicide after being shot by police.

Geography

Primary contributors to environmental noise include U.S. Route 101, El Camino Real, Leavesley Road and other major arterials.  The number of people exposed to sound levels above 60 CNEL is approximately 4,000.

Climate

Due to the moderating influence of the Pacific Ocean, Gilroy experiences a warm Mediterranean climate (Köppen Csb, bordering on Csa). Snowfall is rare; occurring approximately once every 20 years, it is light and short-lived. Summer months are characterized by coastal fog which arrives from the ocean around 10 p.m. and dissipates the next morning by 10 a.m. During summer afternoons, the maritime influence lowers and, as a result, Gilroy is much more prone to heat waves than nearby geographical areas to its north and west. Winter months have many sunny and partly cloudy days, with frequent breaks between rainstorms. The local terrain is not conducive to tornadoes, severe windstorms, or thunderstorms. The local climate supports chaparral and grassland biomes, with stands of live oak at higher elevations.

The record high temperature of  occurred on July 15, 1972. The record low temperature of  occurred on December 22–24, 1990.

There are an average of 55.0 days with measurable precipitation.

 Demographics 

 2020 
According to the 2020 United States Census, Gilroy is growing with a population standing at 59,520. This represents about 3% of Santa Clara County's population. As of the 2020 U.S. Census, the city's demographic breakdown stands at 58.3% Hispanic or Latino, 26.7% Caucasian, 9.9% Asian, 1.8% African American, 0.5% Native American and 19.8% from two or more races.  Average home costs in the area are in the $680,500 range.

2010
The 2010 United States Census reported that Gilroy had a population of 48,821. The racial makeup of Gilroy was 28,674 (58.7%) White, 942 (1.9%) African American, 831 (1.7%) Native American, 3,448 (7.1%) Asian, 111 (0.2%) Pacific Islander, 12,322 (25.2%) from other races, and 2,493 (5.1%) from two or more races. Hispanic or Latino of any race were 28,214 persons (57.8%).

The Census reported that 48,015 people (98.3% of the population) lived in households, 642 (1.3%) lived in non-institutionalized group quarters, and 164 (0.3%) were institutionalized.

There were 14,175 households, out of which 7,111 (50.2%) had children under the age of 18 living in them, 8,160 (57.6%) were opposite-sex married couples living together, 2,212 (15.6%) had a female householder with no husband present, 964 (6.8%) had a male householder with no wife present.  There were 996 (7.0%) unmarried opposite-sex partnerships, and 102 (0.7%) same-sex married couples or partnerships. 2,136 households (15.1%) were made up of individuals, and 908 (6.4%) had someone living alone who was 65 years of age or older. The average household size was 3.39.  There were 11,336 families (80.0% of all households); the average family size was 3.69.

The population was spread out, with 14,983 people (30.7%) under the age of 18, 4,514 people (9.2%) aged 18 to 24, 14,104 people (28.9%) aged 25 to 44, 11,122 people (22.8%) aged 45 to 64, and 4,098 people (8.4%) who were 65 years of age or older.  The median age was 32.4 years. For every 100 females, there were 98.5 males.  For every 100 females age 18 and over, there were 97.1 males.

The homeowner vacancy rate was 1.7%; the rental vacancy rate was 4.6%.  27,798 people (56.9% of the population) lived in owner-occupied housing units and 20,217 people (41.4%) lived in rental housing units.

2000

As of the United States 2000 Census, there were 41,464 people, 11,869 households, and 9,590 families residing in the city. The racial makeup of the city was 58.9% White, 1.8% African American, 1.6% Native American, 4.4% Asian, 0.3% Pacific Islander, 27.7% from other races, and 5.4% from two or more races.  53.8% of the population were Hispanic or Latino of any race.

There were 11,869 households, out of which 47.7% had children under the age of 18 living with them, 60.8% were married couples living together, 14.2% had a female householder with no husband present, and 19.2% were non-families. 14.3% of all households were made up of individuals, and 5.9% had someone living alone who was 65 years of age or older.  The average household size was 3.46 and the average family size was 3.74.

In the city, the population was spread out, with 32.6% under the age of 18, 10.0% from 18 to 24, 32.7% from 25 to 44, 18.0% from 45 to 64, and 6.8% who were 65 years of age or older.  The median age was 30 years. For every 100 females, there were 99.3 males. For every 100 females age 18 and over, there were 98.6 males.

The median income for a household in the city was $66,401, and the median income for a family was $80,371. Males had a median income of $45,759 versus $34,710 for females. The per capita income for the city was $22,071.  About 7.3% of families and 10.4% of the population were below the poverty line, including 12.8% of those under 18 and 6.5% of those 65 and older.

 Economy 
The top five employers in Gilroy are: Gilroy Unified School District, Christopher Ranch LLC, Saint Louise Regional Hospital, Wal-Mart, and Olam International.

 Arts and culture 

 Annual cultural events 
 Gilroy Garlic Festival
Gilroy also has over 20 wineries and tasting rooms located along the Santa Clara Valley Wine Trail.

Twin towns – sister cities

Gilroy is twinned with:

 Angra do Heroísmo, Portugal
 Koror, Palau
 Monticelli d'Ongina, Italy
 Saint-Clar, France
 Takko, Japan
 Tecate, Mexico

 Parks and recreation 
 Coyote Lake-Harvey Bear Ranch County Park , immediately east of Gilroy
 Gilroy Gardens, west side of Gilroy on State Route 152 (AKA Hecker Pass).
 Henry W. Coe State Park

Government

 Education 
Gilroy Unified School District operates the city's public schools, including Gilroy High School, Gilroy Early College Academy (GECA), and Christopher High School.

Gavilan College's campus is located at the southern edge of Gilroy.

Santa Clara County Library operates the Gilroy Library.

 Media 

 Print and online 
 Gilroy Dispatch Television 
 CMAP TV - Community Media Access Partnership, with studio and facilities located in downtown Gilroy, operates Channels 17, 18, 19 & 20 on Charter/Spectrum Cable as well as streaming online.

 Radio 
 KBAY, 94.5 FM (licensed to Gilroy, studio in San Jose)
 KAZA, 1290 AM (no longer transmitting from Gilroy)
 KFAT: From 1975 until January 16, 1983, Gilroy was home to an eclectic freeform country/rock station known as KFAT.  This station (now KBAY) was the focus of much of the Central Coast counterculture. spiritual successor, KPIG, broadcasts out of Freedom, California initially with many of the same personnel who were at KFAT.

 Transportation 

 Major highways 
 U.S. Route 101
 State Route 152 – Several proposals to improve eastbound State Routes 152 and 156 are stalled because of funding concerns.

 Public transportation 
 The Santa Clara Valley Transportation Authority provides local buses and express buses to San Jose and Sunnyvale.
 Gilroy is the southern terminus of Caltrain, which operates three northbound and three southbound rush-hour commute trains each weekday between the Gilroy station and the Santa Clara Valley, San Francisco Peninsula and San Francisco.
 Amtrak California's Capitol Corridor line runs a San Jose–Santa Barbara Thruway Motorcoach connection with a stop in Gilroy.
 Monterey-Salinas Transit's Line 55, which stops in Gilroy, is a rush-hour San Jose–Monterey express bus that also serves as an Amtrak Thruway Motorcoach connection.
 San Benito County Express provides intercounty bus service to Hollister and San Juan Bautista.

Notable people
Ivie Anderson (1904–1949) - jazz singer best known for performing with Duke Ellington's Orchestra from 1931 to 1942
Maryedith Burrell (born 1952) - film and television producer, writer, actress and comedian
Reginald B. Desiderio (1918-1950) - U.S. Medal of Honor recipient, Korean War
Jeff Garcia (born 1970) - quarterback for the NFL's San Francisco 49ers, Cleveland Browns, Detroit Lions, Philadelphia Eagles, and Tampa Bay Buccaneers
Chris Gimenez (born 1982) - professional baseball player for the Minnesota Twins, Cleveland Indians, Seattle Mariners, Tampa Bay Rays, and Texas Rangers
Robert Guerrero (born 1983) - professional boxer, three-time IBF champion, WBA and WBO interim champion
Gene Hildebrand (1887–1921) - U. S. national champion jockey
John Hudson (1919–1996) - US Army Corps, actor, known for Gunfight at the O.K. Corral, G.I. Blues, Dragnet 1967, 77 Sunset Strip, I Dream of Jeannie, Sea Hunt, Gunsmoke, and Adam-12.
William Hudson (1919–1974) - actor, Ranger Clark in Rocky Jones, Space Ranger; Special Agent Mike Andrews in the Emmy-nominated spy drama I Led Three Lives; Voyage to the Bottom of the Sea; Attack of the 50 Foot Woman''
George Washington Kirk (1837–1905) - Union Colonel of the Civil War, died in Gilroy
Olga Talamante (born 1950) - Chicana political activist and political prisoner

References

External links

 

 
1870 establishments in California
Cities in Santa Clara County, California
Cities in the San Francisco Bay Area
Incorporated cities and towns in California
Populated places established in 1870